Cheng Wu-fei (30 December 1911 – 24 August 2000) was a Chinese painter. His work was part of the painting event in the art competition at the 1948 Summer Olympics.

References

1911 births
2000 deaths
20th-century Chinese painters
Chinese painters
Olympic competitors in art competitions
Place of birth missing